Haplodiploidy is a sex-determination system in which males develop from unfertilized eggs and are haploid, and females develop from fertilized eggs and are diploid. Haplodiploidy is sometimes called arrhenotoky.

Haplodiploidy determines the sex in all members of the insect orders Hymenoptera (bees, ants, and wasps) and Thysanoptera ('thrips'). The system also occurs sporadically in some spider mites, Hemiptera, Coleoptera (bark beetles), and rotifers.

In this system, sex is determined by the number of sets of chromosomes an individual receives. An offspring formed from the union of a sperm and an egg develops as a female, and an unfertilized egg develops as a male. This means that the males have half the number of chromosomes that a female has, and are haploid.

The haplodiploid sex-determination system has a number of peculiarities. For example, a male has no father and cannot have sons, but he has a grandfather and can have grandsons. It is this point which drives the kin selection theory of how eusociality evolved. Whether haplodiploidy did in fact pave the way for the evolution of eusociality is still a matter of debate.

Another feature of the haplodiploidy system is that recessive lethal and deleterious alleles will be removed from the population rapidly because they will automatically be expressed in the males (dominant lethal and deleterious alleles are removed from the population every time they arise, as they kill any individual they arise in).

Haplodiploidy is not the same thing as an X0 sex-determination system.  In haplodiploidy, males receive one half of the chromosomes that females receive, including autosomes.  In an X0 sex-determination system, males and females receive an equal number of autosomes, but when it comes to sex chromosomes, females will receive two X chromosomes while males will receive only a single X chromosome.

Mechanisms 

Several models have been proposed for the genetic mechanisms of haplodiploid sex-determination. The model most commonly referred to is the complementary allele model. According to this model, if an individual is heterozygous for a certain locus, it develops into a female, whereas hemizygous and homozygous individuals develop into males. In other words, diploid offspring develop from fertilized eggs, and are normally female, while haploid offspring develop into males from unfertilized eggs.
Diploid males would be infertile, as their cells would not undergo meiosis to form sperm.  Therefore, the sperm would be diploid, which means that their offspring would be triploid.  Since hymenopteran mother and sons share the same genes, they may be especially sensitive to inbreeding: Inbreeding reduces the number of different sex alleles present in a population, hence increasing the occurrence of diploid males.

After mating, each fertile hymenopteran female stores sperm in an internal sac called the spermatheca. The mated female controls the release of stored sperm from within the organ: If she releases sperm as an egg passes down her oviduct, the egg is fertilized.
Social bees, wasps, and ants can modify sex ratios within colonies which maximizes relatedness among members and generates a workforce appropriate to surrounding conditions. In other solitary hymenopterans, the females lay unfertilized male eggs on poorer food sources while laying the fertilized female eggs on better food sources, possibly because the fitness of females will be more adversely affected by shortages in their early life. Sex ratio manipulation is also practiced by haplodiploid ambrosia beetles, who lay more male eggs when the chances for males to disperse and mate with females in different sites are greater.

Sex-determination in honey bees 

In honeybees, the drones (males) are entirely derived from the queen, their mother. The diploid queen has 32 chromosomes and the haploid drones have 16 chromosomes.  Drones produce sperm cells that contain their entire genome, so the sperm are all genetically identical except for mutations.  The male bees' genetic makeup is therefore entirely derived from the mother, while the genetic makeup of the female worker bees is half derived from the mother, and half from the father. Thus, if a queen bee mates with only one drone, any two of her daughters will share, on average,  of their genes. The diploid queen's genome is recombined for her daughters, but the haploid father's genome is inherited by his daughters "as is". It is also possible for a laying worker bee to lay an unfertilised egg, which is always a male.

There are rare instances of diploid drone larvae. This phenomenon usually arises when there is more than two generations of brother-sister mating. Sex determination in honey bees is initially due to a single locus, called the complementary sex determiner (csd) gene. In developing bees, if the conditions are that the individual is heterozygous for the csd gene, they will develop into females. If the conditions are so that the individual is hemizygous or homozygous for the csd gene, they will develop into males. The instances where the individual is homozygous at this gene are the instances of diploid males. Diploid males do not survive to adulthood, as the nurse worker bees will cannibalize the diploid males upon hatching.

While workers can lay unfertilized eggs that become their sons, haplodiploid sex-determination system increases the individual's fitness due to indirect selection. Since the worker is more related to the queen's daughters (her sisters) than to her own offspring, helping the queen's offspring to survive helps the spread of the same genes that the worker possesses more efficiently than direct reproduction.

Batches of worker bees are short lived and are constantly being replaced by the next batch, so this kin selection is possibly a strategy to ensure the proper working of the hive. However, since queens usually mate with a dozen drones or more, not all workers are full sisters.  Due to the separate storage of drone sperm, a specific batch of brood may be more closely related than a specific batch of brood laid at a later date. However, many other species of bees, including bumblebees, such as Bombus terrestris, are monandrous. This means that sisters are almost always more related to one another than they would be to their own offspring, thus eliminating the conflict of variable relatedness present in honeybees.

Sex determination in chalcidoid wasps 
In wasps of the genus Nasonia, a non-CSD method of sex determination has been documented. The most recent accepted model for this non-CSD system is called Maternal Effect Genomic Imprinting Sex Determination (MEGISD). This model involves a masculinizing/virilizing maternal effect gene that “imprints upon” the cytoplasmic component of oocytes, and an “unimprinted” paternal contribution (in female offspring) that provides a counter effect to virilization and allows for female development to occur. Since all diploid eggs become female (due to the factor originating in the male genetic contribution that prevents masculinization), this differs from CSD in that under CSD, diploid eggs can become males if they are homozygous or hemizygous.

Relatedness ratios in haplodiploidy 

Relatedness is used to calculate the strength of kin selection (via Hamilton's rule). The haplodiploidy hypothesis proposes that the unusual  relatedness coefficient amongst full haplodiploid sisters is responsible for the frequency of evolution of eusocial behavior in hymenopterans.  A eusocial worker helping her mother birth more sisters propagates more of her own genes than had she reproduced herself.

In normal sexual reproduction, the father has two sets of chromosomes, and crossing over takes place between the chromatids of each pair during the meiosis which produces the sperm. Therefore, the sperms are not identical, because in each chromosome of a pair there will be different alleles at many of the loci. But when the father is haploid all the sperms are identical (except for a small number where gene mutations have taken place in the germ line). So, all female offspring inherit the male's chromosomes 100% intact. As long as a female has mated with only one male, all her daughters share a complete set of chromosomes from that male. In Hymenoptera, the males generally produce enough sperm to last the female for her whole lifetime after a single mating event with that male.

Relatedness coefficients in haplodiploid organisms are as follows, assuming that a female has only mated once. These ratios apply, for example, throughout a bee hive, unless some laying workers produce offspring, which will all be males from unfertilised eggs: in that case, average relatedness will be lower than shown.

{| class="wikitable" style="text-align:center"
|+ Shared gene proportions in haplo-diploid sex-determination system relationships
|-
! Sex
! style="width:100px;"| Female
! style="width:100px;"| Male
|-
! Daughter
| 
| 1
|-
! Son
| 
| 
|-
! Mother
| 
| 1
|-
! Father
| 
| 
|-
! Sister
| 
| 
|-
! Brother
| 
| 
|-
! Maternal Aunt
| 
| 
|-
! Maternal Uncle
| 
| 
|-
! Paternal Aunt
| 
| 
|-
! Paternal Uncle
| 
| 
|-
! Niece (sister's daughter)
| 
| 
|-
! Niece (brother's daughter)
| 
| 
|-
! Nephew (sister's son)
| 
| 
|}

Under this assumption that mothers only mate once, sisters are more strongly related to each other than to their own daughters. This fact has been used to explain the evolution of eusociality in many hymenopterans. However, colonies which have workers from multiple queens or queens which have mated multiple times will have worker-to-worker relatedness which is less than worker-to-daughter relatedness, such as in Melipona scutellaris.

See also
 Green-beard effect
 Ploidy
 Pseudo-arrhenotoky
 Sexual differentiation
 Worker policing
 X chromosome
 Y chromosome

References

Bibliography
 
 
 

Sex-determination systems
Beekeeping
Hymenoptera
Insect genetics